Rocketmen was a constructible strategy game produced by WizKids and released in 2005 and discontinued in 2006. Part of its marketing included animated adventures based on the character of Nick Sion, a rebel and adventurer facing the evil alliance of Terra and Mars.

Announced by Capcom, Rocketmen: Axis Of Evil, a downloadable arcade style video game based on the constructible strategy game, was slated to be released Fall 2007 for the PlayStation Network and Xbox Live Arcade.

Rocketmen: Axis of Evil received a Vanguard Unique Game Award at the 2006 Origins Game Fair.

Description
Similar to Wizkids's sailing-themed Pirates of the Spanish Main, Rocketmen is a game featuring spaceships constructed from polystyrene cards purchased in randomly assorted booster packs.  Ships can be customized with various crew and equipment configurations, all of which are used to construct a single fleet.  A single booster pack can contain enough for a basic game (two ships, a crew card, a resource card, an asteroid card, a die, and a rules booklet), but maximum customizability requires access to a wider collection.

Ship Types include:
Fighter Squadrons
Rocketships
Cruisers
Space Stations
Harvesters

Pod Types include:
Arc Laser (red)
Shields (blue)
Tractor beam (purple)

In addition, there are asteroid cards used as a home base during most scenarios.  There are also resource chips (called microids) used to construct ships held in reserve in certain games, or as victory points in others.

Factions
The setting for Rocketmen: Axis of Evil is heavily influenced by movie serial-era space operas.

Legion of Terra – ruled by a xenophobic totalitarian leader Lord Invictus, the Legion of Terra is a vastly powerful army of disciplined soldiers
Mars – allied with Terra in the Axis of Evil, the green-skinned Martians have a society entirely based on war
Venus – part of the Alliance of Free Planets, the blue-skinned Venusians are a people who believe in logic, science, and pacifism and follow a matriarchal society.
Mercury – part of the Alliance of Free Planets yet traditional enemies of the people of Venus, the golden-skinned Amazon warriors of Mercury are also a matriarchal society, ruled by the Empress Armada.
Rebels – part of the Alliance of Free Planets, the Terran Rebels fight against their own people in an effort to free Earth

Sets
Axis of Evil – Base set.
Battle of Titans – Released December 2005. This set introduced the factions of Saturn, Io, and Ganymede. It also added the Tractor beam pod type (purple), the Harvester ship and Torpedoes.

Web Episodes

Seven episodes were produced based on the Rocketmen game featuring the protagonist Nick Sion, a member of the Alliance of Free Planets, as they take on the Axis of Evil.

Reviews
Pyramid

References

External links
Rocketmen homepage at WizKids (This page no longer exists.)
Web Episodes

Card games introduced in 2005
Miniature wargames
Collectible miniatures games
Fiction about the Solar System
Origins Award winners
WizKids games
Jordan Weisman games